Agra North Assembly constituency is one of the 403 constituencies of the Uttar Pradesh Legislative Assembly, India. It is a part of the Agra district and one of the five assembly constituencies in the Agra Lok Sabha constituency. First assembly election in this assembly constituency was conducted in 2012 after the constituency came into existence in the year 2008 as a result of the "Delimitation of Parliamentary and Assembly Constituencies Order, 2008".

Wards / Areas
Agra North Assembly constituency comprises Dayalbagh and Swamibagh (Nagar parishad)s, ward numbers 1, 5, 22, 26, 27, 31, 32, 33, 35, 38, 42, 43, 45, 48, 51, 55, 62, 66, 70, 78 & 79 in Agra municipal corporation.

Members of the Legislative Assembly

 *By Election

Election results

2022

2019

See also

Agra district
Agra (Graduates constituency)
Agra Lok Sabha constituency
Government of Uttar Pradesh
List of Vidhan Sabha constituencies of Uttar Pradesh
Uttar Pradesh
Uttar Pradesh Legislative Assembly

References

External links
 

Assembly constituencies of Uttar Pradesh
Agra
Constituencies established in 2008
2008 establishments in Uttar Pradesh
Politics of Agra district